Gjon Gazulli Gjadër, Republic of Venice, 1400 – Dubrovnik, 19 February 1465) was an Albanian Dominican friar, humanist scholar, and diplomat.

Life
Gazulli attended schools in Shkodër and Ragusa, and in 1430 he graduated from the University of Padua. In 1432 he traveled to the Hungarian royal court where he attempted to persuade Sigismund I to support Albanian resistance against the Ottoman Empire. He broke his mission off in 1433, when he was appealed to be a professor of mathematics and astronomy at the University of Padua. Years later he was acting as a diplomat with the Italian principalities' courts, representing the interests of Skanderbeg and of the League of Lezhë.

His lasting mathematical and astronomical works were written in Latin. He had a reputation for considerable knowledge in Italy and in Hungary, as well. His brother, Pal Gazulli (1405–1470), was the diplomat of Skanderbeg and of the League of Lezhë in Ragusa. He had a second brother named Andrea Gazulli, also mentioned as prominent.

Notes

References

Sources

External links 
"Gjin Gazulli" Technical High School in Prishtina
Core biographical data (in Albanian)
Hrvatska enciklopedija LZMK Gazulli, Gjin (Gazulić Ivan, Joannes) (in Croatian)

1400 births
1465 deaths
People from Lezhë
Albanian mathematicians
Albanian male writers
Albanian diplomats
15th-century Albanian Roman Catholic priests
15th-century Albanian writers
Venetian Albanians
15th-century Latin writers
Albanian astronomers
Albanian humanists